Pistol Grip is an American street punk band, formed in Walnut, California in 1997. Their sound has been described as a mixture of the UK and LA styles of punk fused with anti-religious and quasi-political lyrics. The band built up a strong local following through playing shows with The Adicts, Agnostic Front, The Generators, Youth Brigade and The Unseen. Their first release was a split album with fellow LA street punk band Fully Loaded. The album caught the attention of BYO Records, who signed the band in 2001.

Discography
 Sounds of the Street Vol. 1 (split with Fully Loaded) (reissued 2002), Urgent Music
 The Shots from the Kalico Rose (2001), BYO Records
 Dropping Food on Their Heads Is Not Enough: Benefit for RAWA (2002), Geykido Comet Records
 Another Round (2003), BYO Records
 Tear It All Down (2004), BYO Records
 Machines of String Theory in C#m (2007), Independent record label

Filmography
 Live At The Glass House (Live DVD) (2003), Kung Fu Records

References

External links
 Official website
 BYO Records site
 Official Myspace

Punk rock groups from California
Street punk groups
BYO Records artists